William Taylor Phillips (born June 18, 1933), nicknamed "T-Bone", is an American former professional baseball left-handed pitcher, who played in Major League Baseball (MLB) for the Milwaukee Braves, Chicago Cubs, Philadelphia Phillies, and Chicago White Sox, from 1956–60 and 1963.

Playing career

Early years
Taylor attended Douglas County High School (Douglasville, Georgia) and earned letters in baseball for three years, graduating in 1950. He attended the University of Georgia on a baseball scholarship for one semester.

Milwaukee Braves
Phillips entered pro baseball in 1951 and joined the Braves' organization in 1953. After spending 1954–55 in military service, he was recalled from Triple-A Wichita in June 1956,  pitched effectively in relief, and then was added to the Milwaukee starting rotation in August. In five starts for the contending Braves, Phillips won three, lost two, and threw three complete games. He then moved back into the bullpen for the stretch drive, which saw the Braves finish just short of the National League (NL) pennant, one game behind the Brooklyn Dodgers. Phillips' rookie season would be his best: he posted his only over-.500 win–loss record (5–3) and his lowest earned run average (ERA) (2.26).

The  Braves would bring home Milwaukee's first NL pennant and World Series triumph, but Phillips slumped badly during the year. In 27 games and 73 innings pitched, he allowed 82 hits, 40 bases on balls, and 45 earned runs; his ERA jumped to 5.55. Phillips did not pitch in the World Series, won by the Braves in seven games over the New York Yankees.

Cubs, Phillies, and White Sox
Then, in December 1957, Phillips was part of a five-player trade with the Chicago Cubs that netted the Braves starting pitcher Bob Rush. The deal set the stage for Phillips' two busiest seasons in the major leagues. In , he worked in 39 games for the Cubs, with a career-high 27 starts. Phillips threw five complete games, and in his only MLB shutout, Phillips blanked his old Milwaukee teammates, 1–0, on six hits May 25 at County Stadium. But he lost ten of 17 decisions and posted a mediocre 4.76 earned run average. Pitching largely in relief, Phillips continued to scuffle with the Phils, losing four of five decisions and putting up a 5.00 ERA in 72 innings pitched. As in 1958, he worked in 39 games, but made only five starts, with one complete game, for the two clubs. It would be Phillips‘ last full year in the major leagues.

Phillips was tagged with the 9–8 defeat, in what was his final MLB decision. In ten games and 14 innings through July 8, Phillips struggled to an 8.36 ERA.

Phillips then returned to the minor leagues and would pitch at Triple-A for three years before his final big-league audition, which came in July 1963 for the Chicago White Sox. In his American League (AL) debut on July 23, Phillips surrendered an eighth-inning grand slam home run to Norm Cash of the Detroit Tigers. It was the game-winning blow, although the loss was charged to Phillips’ predecessor on the mound, Eddie Fisher, who had put the winning run on base before Phillips entered the game. In later appearances against the New York Yankees (August 18) and Boston Red Sox (August 22), Phillips was treated roughly, and he finished his White Sox tenure with a 10.29 earned run average in ten games. He spent 1964 at Triple-A before retiring as an active player.

In 147 big league games, 102 in relief, Phillips posted a 16–22 record and 4.82 earned run average, allowing 460 hits and 211 bases on balls in 438 innings pitched. He struck out 233, earned six career saves, and threw nine complete games.

References

External links

Taylor Phillips at SABR (Baseball BioProject)

1933 births
Living people
American military personnel of the Korean War
Atlanta Crackers players
Baseball players from Atlanta
Buffalo Bisons (minor league) players
Chicago Cubs players
Chicago White Sox players
Dallas Rangers players
Indianapolis Indians players
Major League Baseball pitchers
Milwaukee Braves players
Philadelphia Phillies players
Rapiños de Occidente players
Waycross Bears players
Wichita Braves players